Julie Wolkenstein (née Julie Poirot-Delpech) is a French writer born in 1968 in Paris. She is the daughter of academician Bertrand Poirot-Delpech and, by her mother, the granddaughter of French industrialist .

A professor of comparative literature at the University of Caen, she wrote a thesis on Henry James.

Works

Novels 
1999: Juliette ou la paresseuse, Paris, P.O.L., 262 p.  
2000: L’Heure anglaise, Paris, P.O.L., 189 p. 
2001: Colloque sentimental, Paris, P.O.L., 344p. 
2004: Happy end, Paris, P.O.L., 199 p. 
2008: L’Excuse, Paris, P.O.L., 344 p. 
2013: Adèle et moi, Paris, P.O.L., 600 p. 
2015: Le Mystère du tapis d'Ardabil, Paris, P.O.L, 384 p. 
2017: Les Vacances, Paris, P.O.L, 368 p. 
2020: Et toujours en été, Paris, P.O.L, 224 p.

Essays, translations 
2000: La Scène européenne : Henry James et le romanesque en question, Paris, Éditions Honoré Champion, coll. « Bibliothèque de littérature générale et comparée », 359 p. 
2006: Les Récits de rêves dans la fiction, Paris, Éditions Klincksieck, 171 p. 
2011: Francis Scott Fitzgerald, translation by Julie Wolkenstein, The Great Gatsby, under the title Gatsby, Paris, P.O.L, 278 p. 

 References 

 External links 
  Adèle et moi,  Julie Wolkenstein on Éditions P.O.L
 Adèle et moi, Julie Wolkenstein on Télérama'' (31 December 2012)
 Julie Wolkenstein on Babelio
 Julie Wolkenstein on France Inter
 Julie Wolkenstein Adèle et moi on YouTube

French women novelists
21st-century French non-fiction writers
21st-century French essayists
Academic staff of the University of Caen Normandy
1968 births
Writers from Paris
Living people
21st-century French women writers